Timberline High School is a three-year public secondary school in Boise, Idaho. Opened in August 1998, it is the fourth and newest traditional high school in the Boise School District, serving its southeast portion. Originally opened as Les Bois Junior High in 1994, it was expanded and the junior high was rebuilt at a different location. The school colors are royal blue, silver, and black and the mascot is a wolf.

Athletics
Timberline competes in athletics in IHSAA Class 5A in the Southern Idaho Conference (5A) (SIC).

State titles
Boys
 Soccer (4): fall 2001, 2014, 2015, 2022
 Baseball (6): 1999, 2000, 2004, 2010, 2013, 2015
 Hockey (1): 2019

Girls
 Soccer (2): fall 2007, 2008 
 Basketball (2): 2003, 2022 
Softball (2): 2005, 2009 
 Golf (1): 2006 
 Tennis (3): 2016, 2018, 2019

Academics
Timberline High School has a successful program for the National Science Bowl competition, earning a second-place finish in the 2019 Western Idaho Regional competition and winning the 2020 Western Idaho Regional competition.

Students have tracked and studied a group of wild wolves, called the Timberline pack, since 2003. The biologists who track the pack noticed its den in the Boise National Forest was empty in the spring of 2020. The Idaho Department of Fish and Game wolf mortality list showed that pups were killed by the U.S. Department of Agriculture Wildlife Services branch. The federal agents killed the pups in order to force the adult wolves to relocate and to reduce the predators' population as they can pose a threat to wildlife and livestock.

Notable graduates
Jeret Peterson, freestyle skier: silver medalist in aerials, 2010 Winter Olympics, class of 2000
Nate Potter, professional American football player
Michael Stefanic, professional baseball player

References

External links
 
Timberline Wolves Athletics

Educational institutions established in 1998
Treasure Valley
High schools in Boise, Idaho
Public high schools in Idaho
1998 establishments in Idaho